Rybnaya Sloboda (literally Fish Sloboda; , Balıq Bistäse) is an urban locality (an urban-type settlement) and the administrative center of Rybno-Slobodsky District in the Republic of Tatarstan, Russia, located on the right bank of the Kama River. As of the 2010 Census, its population was 7,684.

History
It was established in the second half of the 16th century and was granted urban-type settlement status in 2004. In the 19th century, it was known for its jewelry and lace artisans. Rybnaya Sloboda has been serving as a district administrative center since 1927.

Administrative and municipal status
Within the framework of administrative divisions, the urban-type settlement of Rybnaya Sloboda serves as the administrative center of Rybno-Slobodsky District, of which it is a part. As a municipal division, Rybnaya Sloboda is incorporated within Rybno-Slobodsky Municipal District as Rybnaya Sloboda Urban Settlement.

Economy
As of 1997, local industrial facilities included several construction enterprises and a butter factory.

Rybnaya Sloboda serves as a port on the Kama River. The nearest railway station is Kazan,  to the northwest.

Demographics

As of 1989, the population was mostly Tatar (60%) and Russian (37%).

Culture and education
Rybnaya Sloboda is home to a museum of military glory. There are two secondary schools and a vocational school.

References

Notes

Sources

Urban-type settlements in the Republic of Tatarstan
Populated places on the Kama River
Laishevsky Uyezd